This is a complete list of the operas written by the Italian composer Nicola Porpora (1686–1768).

List

References

Sources
Monson, Dale E. (1992), "Porpora, Nicola" in The New Grove Dictionary of Opera, ed. Stanley Sadie (London)

External links

 
Lists of operas by composer